Jayadeva Uyangoda is a political scientist and constitutional expert in Sri Lanka.

Uyangoda Maha Radage Jamis as his name appeared in the birth certificate, Uyangoda was a leftist student leader and a member of the Janatha Vimukthi Peramuna (JVP) movement in the 1970s. He was arrested following the aborted insurrection of 1971 and was imprisoned by the courts. Later he was released with other JVP rebels on an unconditional pardon by the newly appointed Jayawardena Regime in late 1970s. Having released from the jail, he did his doctoral research in the University of Hawaii on Nationalism and State Formation in Bangladesh. He remains one of Sri Lanka's most veteran commentators on ethnic conflict and human rights. He worked with Dr. Neelan Tiruchelvam in drafting the model constitution in 1999.

, Uyangoda is a professor in the Department of Political Science and Public Policy at the University of Colombo and Founder-Director of the Centre for Policy Research and Analysis, Colombo. He is a former Chairman of the Sri Lanka Foundation, Colombo.

He was the founder editor and later co-editor of Pravada, an academic journal in English that focuses on Sri Lanka and South Asia. He continues to write prolifically in Sinhala and English.

References

1944 births
Living people
Janatha Vimukthi Peramuna members
Sri Lankan political scientists
Sinhalese academics
Academic staff of the University of Colombo
Sinhalese writers